The Cornish Nationalist Party (CNP) is a political party, founded by Dr James Whetter, who campaigned for independence for Cornwall.

History
It was formed by people who left Cornwall's main nationalist party Mebyon Kernow on 28 May 1975, but it is no longer for independence.

A separate party with a similar name (Cornish National Party) existed from 1969.

The split with Mebyon Kernow was based on the same debate that was occurring in most of the other political parties campaigning for autonomy from the United Kingdom at the time (such as the Scottish National Party and Plaid Cymru): whether to be a centre-left party, appealing to the electorate on a social democratic line, or whether to appeal emotionally on a centre-right cultural line. Originally, another subject of the split was whether to embrace devolution as a first step to full independence (or as the sole step if this was what the electorate wished) or for it to be "all or nothing".

The CNP essentially represented a more right-wing outlook from those who disagree that economic arguments were more likely to win votes than cultural. The CNP worked to preserve the Celtic identity of Cornwall and improve its economy, and encouraged links with Cornish people overseas and with other regions with distinct identities. It also gave support to the Cornish language and commemorated Thomas Flamank, a leader of the Cornish Rebellion in 1497, at an annual ceremony at Bodmin on 27 June each year.

The CNP was for some time seen as more of a pressure group, as it did not put up candidates for any elections, although its visibility and influence within Cornwall is negligible. , it is now registered on the UK political parties register, and so Mebyon Kernow is no longer the only registered political party based in Cornwall. In April 2009, a news story reported that the CNP had re-formed following a conference in Bodmin; however, it did not contest any elections that year.

Dr Whetter was the founder and editor of the CNP quarterly journal, The Cornish Banner (An Baner Kernewek), within the actions of the Roseland Institute. Since his death in 2018 the CNP has been led by Androw Hawke.

A newspaper article and a revamp of the party website in October 2014 state that the party is now to contest elections once more.
 
John Le Bretton, vice-chairman of the party, said: "The CNP supports the retention of Cornwall Council as a Cornwall-wide authority running Cornish affairs and we call for the British government in Westminster to devolve powers to the council so that decisions affecting Cornwall can be made in Cornwall".

The CNP polled 227 (0.4) votes in Truro during the 1979 UK General Election, 364 (0.67) in North Cornwall in the 1983 UK General Election, and 1,892 (1.0) at the European Parliament elections in the Cornwall and Plymouth constituency in 1984. The candidate on all three occasions was the founder and first leader of the CNP, Dr James Whetter.

The CNP had one parish councillor, CNP leader Androw Hawke who was elected to Polperro Community Council for the second time on 4 May 2017.

The reformed party was registered with the Electoral Commission in 2014, but ceased to be registered in 2017.

Policy
The Policy Statement and Programme of the CNP were published in 1975 and included the following points:

 To look after the interests of Cornish people.
 To preserve and enhance the identity of Kernow, an essentially Celtic identity.
 To achieve self-government for Kernow.
 Total sovereignty will be exercised by the Cornish state over the land within its traditional border.
 Kernow's official language will be Cornish.
 Better job prospects for Cornish people.
 Reduction of unemployment to an acceptable level (2.5%).
 The protection of the self-employed and small businesses in Cornwall.
 Cheaper housing and priority for Cornish people.
 Discouragement of second homes.
 Controls over tourism.
 The Cornish state will have control over the number and nature of immigrants.
 The establishment of a Cornish economic department to aid the basic industries of farming, fishing, china clay and mining and secondary industries developing from these.
 Improved transport facilities in Cornwall with greater scope for private enterprise to operate.
 Existing medical and welfare services for Cornish people will be developed and improved.
 Protection of Cornish natural resources, including offshore resources.
 Conservation of the Cornish landscape and the unique Cornish environment, culture and identity. 
 Courses on Cornish language and history should be made available in schools for those who want them.
 Recognition of the Cornish flag of St Piran and the retention of the Tamar border with England.
 The rule of law will be upheld by the Cornish state and the judiciary will be separate from the legislative and executive functions of the state.
 The Cornish state will create a home defence force, linked to local communities and civil units of administration.
 Young Cornish people will be given instruction as to world religions and secular philosophies but the greatest attention will be given to Christianity and early Celtic beliefs.
 A far greater say in government for Cornish people (by referendums if necessary) and the decentralisation of considerable powers to a Cornish nation within a united Europe - special links being established with our Celtic brothers and sisters in Scotland, Ireland, Isle of Man, Wales and Brittany.

The party's policies include the following:

Calling for more legislative powers to be given to Cornwall Council. The authority should effectively become the Cornish government, with town and parish councils acting as local government.
Cornwall council should have a reduction in councillors, with standardisation of electoral areas and constituencies in throughout Cornwall.
The Westminster government should appoint a Minister for Cornwall and confirm there will be no further plans to have any parliamentary constituency covering part of Cornwall and Devon.

Image
There have been perceived image problems as the CNP has been seen as similarly styled to the BNP and NF (the nativist British National Party and National Front), and during the 1970s letters were published in the party magazine The Cornish Banner (An Baner Kernewek) sympathetic to the NF and critical of "Zionist" politicians. The CNP also formed a controversial uniformed wing known as the Greenshirts led by the CNP Youth Movement leader and Public Relations Officer, Wallace Simmons who also founded the pro-NF Cornish Front. (Although the CNP and CF were sympathetic to Irish republicanism while the NF was supportive of Ulster loyalism, with the exception of leading NF figures like Patrick Harrington, who refused to condemn the IRA during an interview for the Channel 4 TV documentary Disciples of Chaos).

See also
List of topics related to Cornwall
Cornish self-government movement
Constitutional status of Cornwall

References

External links
The CNP at the Roseland Institute
The Cornish Banner website
2017 Spectator magazine article about Cornish Nationalism, Mebyon Kernow and the CNP

Political parties established in 1975
1975 establishments in the United Kingdom
Home rule in the United Kingdom
Conservative parties in the United Kingdom
Politics of Cornwall
Cornish nationalist parties
Right-wing parties in the United Kingdom